James Gillespie (22 March 1868 – 5 August 1932) was a Scottish footballer who played for Clyde, Sunderland Albion, Sunderland, Third Lanark, Ayr and Scotland.

Football career
Gillespie, an outside right, joined Sunderland Albion from Clyde in 1891,  moving on to Sunderland in 1892 when Albion folded. Gillespie won the English league championship twice with Sunderland, in 1893 and 1895, and won the 1895 World Championship. He scored a total of 57 goals in 146 appearances for the club in all official competitions.

He returned to Scotland in 1897 with Third Lanark and it was with the Glasgow club that he won his only international cap aged 30. Despite scoring a hat-trick in Scotland's 5–2 win over Wales on 19 March 1898 (with the others from fellow debutant James McKee), he was never capped again for his country. Away from football he worked as an upholsterer and was based in Bearsden.

Honours
Sunderland
 Football League champions: 1892–93, 1894–95

See also
 List of Scotland national football team hat-tricks

References

1868 births
1932 deaths
Scottish footballers
Footballers from Glasgow
People from Gorbals 
Clyde F.C. players
Sunderland A.F.C. players
Sunderland Albion F.C. players
Third Lanark A.C. players
Scotland international footballers
Association football outside forwards
Scottish Football League players
English Football League players
Scottish Football League representative players